Melliangee Pérez-Maldonado (born ca. 21 June 1976) is a Puerto Rican lyric soprano singer of classical music and opera as well as other music genres.

Early years
Pérez was born in Ponce, Puerto Rico. She graduated from Dr. Pila High School in Ponce in 1994. She studied at the Conservatory of Music of Puerto Rico as well as studying voice under Zoraida Lopez and Justino Díaz.

Career
Pérez has represented Puerto Rico at various festivals in Europe. She has performed with all the opera companies in the Island as well as performing in Europe, the United States, Central America, and the Caribbean. In August 2010, she was soprano soloist at the performance of Beethoven's Ninth Symphony with the Orquesta Sinfónica Nacional in Santo Domingo, Dominican Republic and made her debut at the Teatro Nacional Eduardo Brito under the musical direction José Antonio Molina.

Repertoire
Pérez's opera roles include Donna Anna (Don Giovanni), Mimi (La bohème), Contessa Almaviva (Le nozze di Figaro), Micaela (Carmen), Elvira (Macías), Lauretta and Nella (Gianni Schicchi), Suzel (L'amico Fritz), Princess Patricia (El espejo de la reina), Isabelle / Madeline (The Face on the Barroom Floor), Little Red Riding Hood (La caperucita roja), Euridice (Orfeo ed Euridice), among others. In the zarzuela genre, her roles include Cecilia Valdés (Cecilia Valdés), Santa (Alma Llanera), Constance (El huésped del sevillano), and Aurora (Las leandras). She has also participated in several zarzuela anthologies: Entre claveles y faroles, Antología de Zarzuela en el Chotis, Viva Madrid and Zarzuelada. She made her debut as a soloist with the Orquesta Sinfónica de Puerto Rico in a concert entitled Music of Broadway, conducted by Roselin Pabón, who is also the general manager of the Arturo Somohano Philharmonic Orchestra of Puerto Rico.

Humanitarian works and initiatives
In 2009 Pérez collaborated with Cuarzo Blanco and others in a special project named "Leamos todos juntos" (Let's Read All Together), to encourage children to read in Puerto Rico as part of UNESCO's World Book Day.

Awards
1994
Resolution in the Puerto Rico Senate (1994) highlighting her accomplishments and talent in opera.
1999
 Metropolitan Opera National Council Auditions (District of Puerto Rico)
2003
 Metropolitan Opera National Council Auditions (District of Puerto Rico)
Resolution in the Puerto Rico House of Representatives (2003) highlighting her accomplishments and talent in opera.
2004
 Metropolitan Opera National Council Auditions (District of Puerto Rico)
2005
 Semi-finalist at the International Francisco Viñas Competition in Barcelona
2008
 Semi-finalist at the International Francisco Viñas Competition in Barcelona
 Soprano of the Year award by UNESCO
2009
"Honorary Member" of the Banda Municipal de Ponce Juan Morel Campos with which she has recorded a DVD celebrating the 125th anniversary of its founding.

See also

List of Puerto Ricans
History of women in Puerto Rico
List of People from Ponce, Puerto Rico

References

See also
 Photo of the soprano singer

1976 births
Living people
Puerto Rican operatic sopranos
Singers from Ponce
21st-century American singers
21st-century American women singers